Eynesbury may refer to:

 Eynesbury, Cambridgeshire, a settlement in England
 Eynesbury, Victoria, a locality in Australia
 Eynesbury Senior College, a specialist Years 10, 11 and 12 college in Adelaide, South Australia